Jan Karel Donatus van Beecq (1638 – April 1722) was a Dutch marine painter, active in England and later in France, where he became a member of the Academy in 1681.

Nomenclature
Although known to art historians by a conjectural Dutch version of his name, all contemporary documentary references use the French forms  Jean-Charles-Dominique or Jean-Charles-Donat (with or without hyphens). The Académie's documents spell his surname "Vambec"   or "Vambecq",  but he signed his work "J. Van Beecq", "JVBeecq", or "I. Van Beec".

Life
According to the record of his death in the minutes of the French Académie, van Beecq was born in Amsterdam in 1638. His earliest dated work, a capriccio view of Antwerp was painted in 1673. His paintings usually depict  warships and battles out at sea, or scenes of harbours  with palatial classical buildings standing directly on the waterfront.

England

Most of his pictures of 1677–9 are of English subjects, and the art historian Gary Schwartz has proposed that should be identified with the  "Vanbeck" recorded as being admitted  to the Painter-Stainers Company in the City of London in  1677. The following year the same Vanbeck is recorded as living with a younger painter, Adriaen van Diest in Durham Yard, leading Schwartz to suggest that, in view of his style, he may have been a pupil of van Diest's grandfather, Willem, and had his origins, like van Diest, in The Hague.

The National Maritime Museum at Greenwich has two paintings by him showing English warships: The Royal Prince before the Wind, (1679)  and Shipping in an Estuary (1701). The latter, an idealised sunlit scene,  painted after his move to France, is his last  signed and dated work.

France
Van Beecq was in Paris by July 1680, when he presented a painting at a meeting of the  Académie royale de Peinture et de Sculpture, of which he became a member on 26 April 1681.  He benefited from the support of Charles Lebrun,  the Académie's patron and founder, who persuaded it, contrary to its usual practice, to pay the artist the full  amount of his entry emolument at once, for "important reasons" which are not recorded.

By 1685 there were four paintings by van Beecq in place at Louis XIV's  new palace at Marly, the decoration of which was organised by Le Brun and  Jules Hardouin Mansart. They are known to have included views of  Algiers Bombarded by Night and The Cannonade of Chios. The latter, the only surviving painting by van Beecq of which  a contemporary documentary record exists, is now in the collection of Musée de la Marine in Paris.  The king also owned  van Beecq's  painting of the bombardment of Genoa by Admiral Dusquesne in 1684; two versions were painted, though neither is known today. Surviving correspondence shows that drawings by eyewitnesses of the bombardment  were gathered by  government officials  as source material to supply to van Beecq, to ensure the accuracy of his representation. A large engraving on two plates was made after the painting by Moyse Jean-Baptiste Fouard.

In 1691 Fouard engraved a series of plates after van Beecq's designs (only one of which is signed by the two men) for the French translation of a history of the Spanish invasion of Mexico, called Histoire de la conquête du Mexique ou de la Novelle Espagne.

He was expelled from the Académie in 1694, depriving him of the prestigious title of peintre du roi,  but readmitted three years later. He did not attend any meetings after 1701, and the minutes of the Académie record his death in April 1722, aged 83.

Notes

References

Attribution:
 

1638 births
1722 deaths
Dutch Golden Age painters
Dutch male painters
Painters from Amsterdam
Dutch marine artists